Ola Abidogun (born 3 August 1993) is a British athlete who competes in T46 sprinting events. He competed for England at the 2010 Commonwealth Games, and was part of the British team at the 2012 Summer Paralympics where he took bronze in the 100m sprint. He has won multiple medals at the junior level and as a senior won a silver in the 2014 European Championships.

Early life
Abidogun was born in Ilford, London.

Career
In 2008 he began competing at the DSE Junior Championships. He competed at the 2010 IWAS World Junior Championships in Olomouc, Czech Republic, where he won the gold medal in the 100m event of his disability sport classification, and the silver medal in the 200m competition. He was chosen for the English team at the 2010 Commonwealth Games. In his T46 100m heat he ran a time of 11.37, and then 11.32 in the semi-final, both of which were personal bests. He placed fifth in the final.

Abidogun wasn't selected for the British team at the 2011 IPC Athletics World Championships, but instead was selected for the 2011 IWAS World Junior Championships and won the same medals as he had in the previous year.

In adult competition, he won silver in the 100m and gold in the 200m at the Paralympic World Cup in May. It had been his début at a World Cup event, and Channel 4 would later describe his performance as announcing "himself as a new GB sprint star". He finished 2011 ranked eighth in the world in the 100m and tenth in the 200m. He was selected for the British team for the 2012 Summer Paralympics in London, to compete in both the T46 100m and 200m.

Abidogun made his debut at the 2012 Summer Paralympics by qualifying for the final of the T46 men's 100m, finishing first in his heat with a time of 11:21secs. He won a bronze medal in the final.

At the IPC Athletics World Championships in Lyon in 2013, Abidogun competed in both the T47 100m and 200m. He finished 5th in the 100m and 7th in the 200m in France.

Abidogun competed at the IPC Athletics European Championships in Swansea in 2014. He won the European silver medal in the T47 100m in a time of 11.38. He had to settle for 4th place in the 200m as he was just edged out of a spot on the podium once more.

In June 2022, he was named in the 72-member squad selected to represent England in athletics at the 2022 Commonwealth Games in Birmingham. He will compete in the T47 100m.

Personal life
Abidogun is a single arm amputee. Abidogun is currently studying law at Nottingham Trent University{ His parents Pastors Kenny and Kemi run Christ the Vine Church based in the Manchester Area which he regularly attends.

References

Living people
1993 births
Athletes (track and field) at the 2010 Commonwealth Games
People from Ilford
Athletes (track and field) at the 2012 Summer Paralympics
Paralympic athletes of Great Britain
English amputees
Athletes from London
Medalists at the 2012 Summer Paralympics
Paralympic bronze medalists for Great Britain
English male sprinters
English sportspeople of Nigerian descent
Paralympic medalists in athletics (track and field)
Commonwealth Games competitors for England
Medalists at the World Para Athletics European Championships